Respiratory acidosis is a state in which decreased ventilation (hypoventilation) increases the concentration of carbon dioxide in the blood and decreases the blood's pH (a condition generally called acidosis).

Carbon dioxide is produced continuously as the body's cells respire, and this CO2 will accumulate rapidly if the lungs do not adequately expel it through alveolar ventilation. Alveolar hypoventilation thus leads to an increased PaCO2 (a condition called hypercapnia). The increase in PaCO2 in turn decreases the HCO3−/PaCO2 ratio and decreases pH.

Types 
Respiratory acidosis can be acute or chronic. 
 In acute respiratory acidosis, the PaCO2 is elevated above the upper limit of the reference range (over 6.3 kPa or 45 mm Hg) with an accompanying acidemia (pH <7.36). 
 In chronic respiratory acidosis, the PaCO2 is elevated above the upper limit of the reference range, with a normal blood pH (7.35 to 7.45) or near-normal pH secondary to renal compensation and an elevated serum bicarbonate (HCO3− >30 mEq/L).

Causes

Acute
Acute respiratory acidosis occurs when an abrupt failure of ventilation occurs. This failure in ventilation may be caused by depression of the central respiratory center by cerebral disease or drugs, inability to ventilate adequately due to neuromuscular disease (e.g., myasthenia gravis, amyotrophic lateral sclerosis, Guillain–Barré syndrome, muscular dystrophy), or airway obstruction related to asthma or chronic obstructive pulmonary disease (COPD) exacerbation.

Chronic
Chronic respiratory acidosis may be secondary to many disorders, including COPD. Hypoventilation in COPD involves multiple mechanisms, including decreased responsiveness to hypoxia and hypercapnia, increased ventilation-perfusion mismatch leading to increased dead space ventilation, and decreased diaphragm function secondary to fatigue and hyperinflation.

Chronic respiratory acidosis also may be secondary to obesity hypoventilation syndrome (i.e., Pickwickian syndrome), neuromuscular disorders such as amyotrophic lateral sclerosis, and severe restrictive ventilatory defects as observed in interstitial lung disease and thoracic deformities.

Lung diseases that primarily cause abnormality in alveolar gas exchange usually do not cause hypoventilation but tend to cause stimulation of ventilation and hypocapnia secondary to hypoxia. Hypercapnia only occurs if severe disease or respiratory muscle fatigue occurs.

Physiological response

Mechanism
Metabolism rapidly generates a large quantity of volatile acid (H2CO3) and nonvolatile acid. The metabolism of fats and carbohydrates leads to the formation of a large amount of CO2. The CO2 combines with H2O to form carbonic acid (H2CO3). The lungs normally excrete the volatile fraction through ventilation, and acid accumulation does not occur. A significant alteration in ventilation that affects elimination of CO2 can cause a respiratory acid-base disorder. The PaCO2 is maintained within a range of 35–45 mm Hg in normal states.

Alveolar ventilation is under the control of the respiratory center, which is located in the pons and the medulla. Ventilation is influenced and regulated by chemoreceptors for PaCO2, PaO2, and pH located in the brainstem, and in the aortic and carotid bodies as well as by neural impulses from lung stretch receptors and impulses from the cerebral cortex. Failure of ventilation quickly increases the PaCO2.

In acute respiratory acidosis, compensation occurs in 2 steps. 
 The initial response is cellular buffering (plasma protein buffers) that occurs over minutes to hours. Cellular buffering elevates plasma bicarbonate (HCO3−) only slightly, approximately 1 mEq/L for each 10-mm Hg increase in PaCO2.
 The second step is renal compensation that occurs over 3–5 days. With renal compensation, renal excretion of carbonic acid is increased and bicarbonate reabsorption is increased. For instance, PEPCK is upregulated in renal proximal tubule brush border cells, in order to secrete more NH3 and thus to produce more HCO3−.

Estimated changes
In renal compensation, plasma bicarbonate rises 3.5 mEq/L for each increase of 10 mm Hg in PaCO2. The expected change in serum bicarbonate concentration in respiratory acidosis can be estimated as follows:

 Acute respiratory acidosis: HCO3− increases 1 mEq/L for each 10 mm Hg rise in PaCO2.
 Chronic respiratory acidosis: HCO3− rises 3.5 mEq/L for each 10 mm Hg rise in PaCO2.

The expected change in pH with respiratory acidosis can be estimated with the following equations:

 Acute respiratory acidosis: Change in pH = 0.08 X ((40 − PaCO2)/10)
 Chronic respiratory acidosis: Change in pH = 0.03 X ((40 − PaCO2)/10)

Respiratory acidosis does not have a great effect on electrolyte levels. Some small effects occur on calcium and potassium levels. Acidosis decreases binding of calcium to albumin and tends to increase serum ionized calcium levels. In addition, acidemia causes an extracellular shift of potassium, but respiratory acidosis rarely causes clinically significant hyperkalemia.

Diagnosis
Diagnoses can be done by doing an ABG (Arterial Blood Gas) laboratory study, with a pH <7.35 and a PaCO2 >45 mmHg in an acute setting. Patients with COPD and other Chronic respiratory diseases will sometimes display higher numbers of PaCO2 with HCO3- >30 and normal pH.

Terminology
Acidosis refers to disorders that lower cell/tissue pH to < 7.35.
Acidemia refers to an arterial pH < 7.36.

See also 

 Acidosis
 Alkalosis
 Arterial blood gas
 Hypercapnia
 Chemical equilibrium
 pCO2
 pH
 pKa
 Metabolic acidosis
 Metabolic alkalosis
 Respiratory alkalosis

References

External links 

 

Acid–base disturbances